Minuscule 184 (in the Gregory-Aland numbering), ε 312 (Soden), is a Greek minuscule manuscript of the New Testament, on parchment. Palaeographically it has been assigned to the 13th century. It has marginalia.

Description 

The codex contains a complete text of the four Gospels on 72 parchment leaves (size ). The text is written in two columns per page, in 24 lines per page (size of column 19.1 by 5 cm), in black ink, the initial letters in red.

The text is divided according to the small Ammonian Sections (in Mark 236 sections), with references to the Eusebian Canons (written below Ammonian Section numbers).

It contains a lectionary markings at the margin for liturgical reading.

Text 

The Greek text of the codex is a representative of the Byzantine text-type. Aland did not place it in any Category.

According to the Claremont Profile Method it belongs to the textual group 1216, as a core member.

Textually it has some relationship to the group 16.

History 

The manuscript is dated by the INTF to the 13th century.

The manuscript was examined by Birch, Scholz, and Burgon. C. R. Gregory saw it in 1886.

It is currently housed at the Laurentian Library (Plutei. VI. 15), at Florence.

See also 

 List of New Testament minuscules
 Biblical manuscript
 Textual criticism

References

Further reading 

 

Greek New Testament minuscules
13th-century biblical manuscripts